This is a list of Everly Brothers songs.

 The columns Song, Recorded, and Album list each song title, the recording date (as far as known), and the album on which the song first appeared.
 The column Author lists the writer or writers of each song.
 The column Notes gives further information. For some songs, several different tracks exist, on diverse releases; some of them are listed here, but not all.

This article does not list songs released solo by Don or Phil.

Studio recordings

Live recordings

See also
The Everly Brothers
The Everly Brothers discography
Felice and Boudleaux Bryant
Jack Keller

References
 EVERLY BROTHERS Fanclub EBI  - timeline and information to every song
 Information Book of The Price Of Fame - Box Set and the Chained to a Memory - Box Set (Bear Family Records)
 Walk Right Back by Roger White 
 allmusic.com : the everly brothers-songs

External links 

 allmusic.com : the everly brothers-songs
 musicbrainz.org
 Article in the Acoustic Guitar Magazine No. 92
 The Everly Brothers Repertoire at BMI

Everly Brothers
The Everly Brothers